The Dobbs County Regiment was a unit of the North Carolina militia that served during the American Revolution.  The regiment was one of thirty-five existing county militias that were authorized by the North Carolina Provincial Congress to be organized on September 9, 1775.  All officers were appointed with commissions from the Provincial Congress.  On May 4, 1776, the regiment was placed under the command of the New Bern District Brigade commanded by Brigadier General Richard Caswell.  The regiment was active until the end of the Revolutionary War in 1783 and was engaged in twelve known battles and skirmishes in North Carolina, South Carolina and Georgia.

Officers
The following listings show the known commanders, officers, staff, and soldiers of the Dobbs County Regiment
 Col. Abraham Sheppard, Sr. (1775-1776)
 Colonel Benjamin Exum (2nd Colonel) (1776-1779)
 Col. James Glasgow (1777-1778 and 1779-1780) 
 Col. William Caswell (1777-1778 and 1779-1780). 2nd Colonel
 Col. James Darnell (1779- )
 Col. Richard Caswell, Jr.

Colonel Richard Caswell, Jr. was the son of Governor Richard Caswell, who was the General in charge of all North Carolina militia and state troops. Colonel Richard Caswell, Jr. was lost at sea on December 27, 1784 during the return voyage from a business trip to Charleston, South Carolina and presumed dead.

Order of battle
The Dobbs County Regiment was involved in 12 known battles and skirmishes:
 February 27, 1776, Moore's Creek Bridge, North Carolina
 March 3, 1779, Brier Creek, Georgia
 June 20, 1779, Stono Ferry, South Carolina
 March 28 to May 12, 1780, Charleston 1780, South Carolina
 August 16, 1780, Camden Court House, South Carolina
 January 17, 1781, Cowpens, South Carolina
 January 30, 1781, Heron's Bridge, North Carolina
 April 25, 1781, Hobkirk's Hill, South Carolina
 August 2, 1781, Rockfish Creek, North Carolina
 August 16, 1781, Battle of Kingston, North Carolina
 August 17, 1781, Webber's Bridge, North Carolina
 August 19, 1781, New Bern, North Carolina

See also
 List of North Carolina militia units in the American Revolution

References

1775 establishments in North Carolina
Dobbs County, North Carolina
North Carolina militia